This is a list of bus routes in Lahore, Pakistan. The buses are operated by Lahore Transport Company and Punjab Mass Transit Authority.

List of bus routes

List of PMTA routes

Operators
 Daewoo Express
 Albayrak-Platform
 PAKOR
 PakOZ
 First Bus

See also 
 Buses in Pakistan
 Transport in Pakistan
 Transport in Lahore
 Metrobus (Lahore)

References 

Bus transport in Pakistan
Transport in Lahore
 
Pakistan transport-related lists
Lahore